Sir Thomas Neville ( 1429 – 1460) was the second son of Richard Neville, 5th Earl of Salisbury, a major nobleman and magnate in the north of England during the fifteenth-century Wars of the Roses, and a younger brother to the more famous Richard Neville, Earl of Warwick, the 'Kingmaker'. Thomas worked closely with them both in administering the region for the Crown, and became a significant player in the turbulent regional politics of northern England in the early 1450s, especially in the Neville family's growing local rivalry with the House of Percy. His wedding in August 1453 is said to have marked the beginning of the armed feud between both houses, in which Thomas and his brother John led a series of raids, ambushes and skirmishes across Yorkshire against the Percy family. Historians describe the feud as setting the stage for the Wars of the Roses, the dynastic struggle between the houses of Lancaster and York for the English throne, and Thomas played a large role in the Neville family's alliance with his uncle, Richard, Duke of York.

Thomas took part in his father's battles, being present at the Battle of Blore Heath in September 1459, where he was captured with his younger brother John by the Lancastrians. As a result, he was imprisoned and later attainted along with his father, brothers, and the Yorkists at the 1459 Parliament of Devils. Being imprisoned, he did not share Salisbury's and Warwick's exile in Calais. On their return, however,  the following year, he was released when Warwick and the future Edward IV together won the Battle of Northampton. When the Duke of York also returned from his exile and claimed the throne from Henry VI, it appears that it was Thomas who was personally responsible for informing the duke of the Neville's collective disapproval of his plans. Joining his father Salisbury, and York's army, which travelled to Yorkshire in December 1460 with the purpose of suppressing Lancastrian-inspired disorder, he took part in the disastrous Battle of Wakefield. The Yorkists went down to a crushing defeat; Thomas was killed in the fighting, and, alongside his father and uncle, his head was impaled above one of the gates of the city of York.

Early career, knighthood and marriage
Thomas Neville was the second son of Richard Neville (1400–1460) and his wife Alice Montagu, 5th Countess of Salisbury (c. 1406–1462), and was probably born soon after his elder brother Richard in 1428, and certainly by 1431. By this time, so historian Michael Hicks says, his parents had had a further two more sons after Thomas: John, and George, who was to have a career in the Church. His first mention in government records is in 1448 when he was appointed steward of the Bishopric of Durham by his uncle, Robert, the Bishop, receiving £20 per annum from diocesan revenues. He became Sheriff of Glamorgan, on 24 March 1450, in which capacity he witnessed a charter of his brother, Warwick the 'Kingmaker', 12 March the next year, during the latter's dispute over the Despenser inheritance. Warwick also appointed Thomas to assist in the management of his Warwickshire estates, for which he received an annuity. Thomas Neville was knighted by King Henry VI, alongside the King's two half-brothers, Edmund and Jasper Tudor, on 5 January 1453 in the Tower of London, an occasion that Griffiths has called "an attempt to retain a loyalty [of the Nevilles] that had recently been strained".

Thomas Neville was licensed by the King on 1 May 1453 to marry Maud Stanhope, the widow of Robert, Lord Willoughby and as such a wealthy heiress. Ralph A. Griffiths has suggested that the announcement of Neville's marriage was the immediate cause of the feud with the Percys. Maud was also niece and joint-heiress of Ralph, Lord Cromwell, one of the richest men in the kingdom, and who was involved in at least two feuds with powerful men at this time. Connecting his family to the Nevilles, it has been said, provided "a counterbalance to Cromwell's enemies". It was a marriage which cost him the massive sum of nearly £2,000 in loans to Salisbury, and "the price the Nevilles could extract was a measure of Cromwell's desperation". Not only, says Griffiths, was any further Neville aggrandisement anathema to the Percys, but the new Cromwell connection gave the Nevilles access to the ex-Percy manors of Wressle and Burwell, which doubtless they still hoped to reclaim.

Feud with the Percy family

The Nevilles were one of four major landowners in the north, along with Richard, 3rd Duke of York, the Crown (as the Duke of Lancaster), and the Percy family, who were the earls of Northumberland. York and the King, however, were effectively absentee landlords so any tension would have existed solely between the Percys and the Nevilles. By 1453, this tension seems to have spilled over into outright violence, with Thomas and his brother John actively seeking out the younger sons of the Earl of Northumberland (the hotheaded Thomas, Lord Egremont and his younger brother Sir Richard Percy) and their retainers.

It was Thomas Neville's wedding party, returning from Cromwell's Tattershall Castle, that was attacked by Egremont at Heworth, York on 24 August 1453 as the Nevilles returned to Yorkshire with his new bride, by a Percy force of supposedly 5,000 men. There were to be further encounters before the Percys were defeated at Stamford Bridge on 31 October 1454, when the Percy brothers, Egremont and Sir Richard, were ambushed by Thomas and John Neville and subsequently imprisoned in Newgate.

Final years

In 1457, Neville was appointed Chamberlain of the Exchequer, along with a co-heir of Ralph, Lord Cromwell. Later that year his father and brother appointed Thomas their deputy on the West March, where they were joint Wardens. For this he received a salary of 500 marks – which, R.L. Storey points out, was "less than a quarter of their official salary". A few months later, he stood as surety for his uncle William, Lord Fauconberg's good behaviour (whom Michael Hicks speculates may have been involved in piracy at this time). By 1459 the domestic political situation had descended into outright civil war; when the earl of Salisbury marched south from his castle at Middleham in September to join up with the duke of York at Ludlow, Thomas marched with him in a 5,000-strong army. On 23 September 1459, they encountered a larger royal force at Blore Heath, which Salisbury defeated, killing its leader, James Tuchet, 5th Baron Audley. Thomas and John, though, were somehow captured near Tarporley, Cheshire, the next day. Hicks has suggested that this was due to their being wounded in battle and sent home; Rosemary Horrox on the other hand posits that they ventured too far from the main army in pursuit of fleeing Lancastrians. Attainted in the Parliament of Devils the next month, they were imprisoned in Chester Castle and not released until their brother Warwick was victorious at the Battle of Northampton in June 1460.  Thomas Neville was appointed, jointly with his father, to Keeper of the Royal Mews as part of the Nevilles' policy of filling the positions of political importance with their own sympathisers. He was immediately, on his release, appointed to commissions to arrest and imprison any who disturbed the peace, and received grants of Duchy of Lancaster estates at the same time.  When the duke of York joined them and claimed the throne in October 1460, the Nevilles were as set against his claim as every other member of the nobility present for the coming parliament. Thomas Neville appears to have been fundamental to Salisbury's resistance to York's claims: possibly with Warwick, it was certainly Thomas who met York at Westminster Palace (where he had evicted the King from his lodgings), and informed the duke that his position was untenable "to both lords and people"; According to P.A. Johnson, the Archbishop of Canterbury, Thomas Bourchier refused to confront the duke of York, so on two occasions "Thomas Neville was sent instead". Two days later, on 13 October 1460, he again went to York: "whatever was then said is unknown, but Neville's mandate must have been both blunt and bluntly delivered". York acquiesced to a compromise.

In the meantime, Lancastrian forces were regrouping in Yorkshire and raiding York's and Salisbury's estates and tenants. Thomas Neville accompanied them when they marched out of London on 2 December 1460 to restore a semblance of order to the region; they arrived at York's Sandal Castle on 21 of the month. It is possible that a Christmas Truce was arranged; in any case, nine days later, York, his son Edmund, Earl of Rutland, Salisbury, Thomas, and many of their closest retainers led a sortie in strength to attack a Lancastrian army gathered near the castle. Here, at the Battle of Wakefield, they went down to a crushing defeat, and Thomas died in combat, his father was subsequently executed, and their heads were displayed above the gates of York.

His remains were removed from the Micklegate Bar after the Yorkists' decisive victory at the Battle of Towton three months later, and buried at the Dominican Priory in York. Along with his father, he was subsequently reinterred with his mother on her death in February 1463 in Bisham Priory.

References

Works cited

 
 
 
 
 
 
 
 
 
 
 
 

1429 births
1460 deaths
Year of birth uncertain
Burials at Bisham Abbey
Neville family
Younger sons of earls
People of the Wars of the Roses
English knights